The Kumai River is a river of Central Kalimantan province, Borneo island, Indonesia.

Location

It empties into Kumai Bay.
The river is navigable by vessels with a draft of  up to the village of Kumai on its right bank,  from the entrance to the bay, and for  further upstream.
Kumai Port is in West Kotawaringin Regency,  from the capital, Pangkalan Bun, and is used for export of palm oil produced in the province.

Environment

Water volumes vary during the year, with highest volumes during the Northwest Monsoon.
At some times of year the river contains relatively little mud.
The river runs through tropical lowland forest for most of its length.
Near its estuary the vegetation is mainly nypa and mangrove.

The peat forest surrounding the Kumai River suffered from droughts and fires in 1982–83 and again in 1997–98.
The Tanjung Puting park, about half of which is peat swamp forest, is famous for a population of about 4000 orangutans.
It is accessed from Kumai by speedboat down the Kumai River and then up the Sekonyer River to Camp Leakey, a journey that takes about 1.5 hours.
The Kumai River forms the northern border of the Tanjung Puting park. 
Beyond that the peat forest has been removed to make way for oil palm plantations.

References

Sources

External links

Rivers of Central Kalimantan
Rivers of Indonesia